Andrei Pavel (born 27 January 1974) is a Romanian tennis coach and former professional tennis player.

Career

Andrei began playing tennis at age eight, and moved to Germany at age sixteen. Turned professional in 1995. He won three singles titles, including the ATP Masters Series tournament in Montreal/Toronto in 2001. He also won seven doubles titles, the latest title being the Open Seat Barcelona, in 2007.

Competed for more than 20 years on the ATP Tour.

Reached No. 13 in the FedEx ATP Rankings and won three singles titles, including the 2001 National Bank Open Presented by Rogers. Reached No. 18 in the FedEx ATP Doubles Rankings and won six doubles titles.

Attended five Olympic Games, and played for 20 years on the Romanian Davis Cup team.

Pavel played what John McEnroe considers to be the best first round match at a Grand Slam he has ever seen at the U.S. Open in August 2006, where he lost to Andre Agassi in four sets; 6–7(4), 7–6(8), 7–6(6), 6–2; taking three and half hours. Had Pavel won, it would have been Agassi's last match in a professional tournament.

The Romanian, Andrei Pavel in 2002, while he was about to play a quarter-final at Roland Garros, he jumped into a car and made an express round-trip to Germany to attend the birth of his son. Which equals to 1000 miles in 24h, in the pouring rain with... Àlex Corretja waiting for his return on the Central. Story of an epic journey. "It's a bit odd that these two events overlapped, says the Romanian. But no matter the sporting challenge: I would not have missed the birth of Marius for the world. The whole story with the rain was a godsend for the press, but for me, it didn’t really made a difference: I would have gone no matter what."

In 2001 he captured the Masters Series Montreal title.

He played his last singles match in his homeland tournament in Bucharest in 2009  to Pablo Cuevas of Uruguay  were he also played two more exhibition matches, one facing Goran Ivanišević, while in the other he paired up with Ilie Năstase against the Mansour Bahrami / Yannick Noah pair. The week before, he had been the captain of Romania's Davis Cup team.

After 25 years of living in Germany, he moved to the US state of Arizona. Now he lives in Bucharest, Romania.

Coaching
Currently coaching Nicholas David Ionel, Filip Jianu and Sebastian Gima.

Coached ATP Tour players Horia Tecău, Benjamin Becker, Marius Copil, the Romanian Davis Cup Team, and worked with Jelena Janković, Tamira Paszek and Simona Halep on the WTA Tour.

2016 Olympic Team Captain (Coach), won silver medal.

Career finals

Singles (3 wins, 6 losses)

Doubles (6 titles, 5 runners-up)

Singles performance timeline 

2004 US Open counts as 3 wins, 0 losses. Roger Federer walkover in round 4, after Pavel withdrew because of a back injury,
 does not count as a Pavel loss (nor a Federer win).

References

External links

 
 
 
 
 
 https://wearetennis.bnpparibas/en/news-tennis/news-results/2609-the-day-andrei-pavel-left-a-match-to-see-the-birth-of-his-son

1974 births
Living people
French Open junior champions
Olympic tennis players of Romania
Sportspeople from Constanța
People from Gütersloh (district)
Sportspeople from Detmold (region)
Romanian expatriate sportspeople in Germany
Romanian male tennis players
Romanian tennis coaches
Tennis players at the 1992 Summer Olympics
Tennis players at the 1996 Summer Olympics
Tennis players at the 2000 Summer Olympics
Tennis players at the 2004 Summer Olympics
Grand Slam (tennis) champions in boys' singles